Psittacotherium (meaning "parrot beast") is an extinct genus of taeniodont from the Paleocene of North America.

References

Mammoths, Sabertooths, and Hominids by Jordi Agusti and Mauricio Anton 
The Beginning of the Age of Mammals by Kenneth D. Rose  
Classification of Mammals by Malcolm C. McKenna and Susan K. Bell  
Evolution of Herbivory in Terrestrial Vertebrates: Perspectives from the Fossil Record by Hans-Dieter Sues

External links
Psittacotherium in the Paleobiology Database

Cimolestans
Paleocene mammals
Paleocene genus extinctions
Paleocene mammals of North America
Fossil taxa described in 1882
Prehistoric mammal genera